American singer Kris Allen has released six studio albums, five EPs, eight singles and five music videos. He self-released an album titled Brand New Shoes in 2007 before rising to prominence in 2009 as the winner of the eighth season of American Idol. His coronation single, "No Boundaries", reached the top 15 on both the American Billboard Hot 100 and Canadian Hot 100 charts. Allen released his self-titled second album in November 2009, which included the successful lead single, "Live Like We're Dying". The album additionally generated the singles "The Truth" and "Alright with Me" in 2010.

Allen released "The Vision of Love" in 2012 as the lead single for his third album, Thank You Camellia. The song yielded minimal chart success and Allen ultimately parted ways with RCA Records. He has since released three albums on his independent label imprint DogBear Records: Horizons (2014), Letting You In (2016), and Somethin' About Christmas (2016). A compilation album 10 was released in 2019.  Kris released five promotional singles in 2021 and one in 2022 via DogBear Records.

Albums

Studio albums

Compilation albums

Extended plays

Singles

Promotional singles

Other charted songs

Music videos

Soundtrack

Songwriting

Songs released by others

Demo recordings

Unreleased songs

Songs in other media

References

Discographies of American artists
American Idol discographies
Pop music discographies
Rock music discographies
discography